Bathore is an area just outside Tirana, the capital of Albania. It is part of the municipality Kamëz.

Bathore was squatted in the early 1990s by migrants from the mountainous north. They had no electricity or water, and were funded by money sent from relatives abroad. They built permanent housing in the hope that this would make an eviction harder for the authorities. The authorities attempted to evict the settlement in 1995, but the squatters fought back and took the deputy prime minister Tritan Shehu hostage.

By 2000, 60 per cent of new inhabitants bought their land from previous squatters, 20 per cent squatted, 6 per cent were given land by the authorities, 2 per cent bought from pre-independence owners and 10 per cent used other methods. The residents promoted slum upgrading and requested infrastructure. Three years later, the 40,000 squatters were tired of waiting on government promises and announced they would march on the capital Tirana. The government quickly acceded to nine out of their ten demands. Bathore has become a middle class suburb of Tirana, connected to all utilities.

References

External links
Aid Convoy – One of the organisations working in Bathore
Photographs of Bathore
Map showing Bathore

Populated places in Kamëz
Villages in Tirana County
Squatting